Louis Byron Perryman (August 15, 1941 – April 1, 2009), also known as Lou Perry, was an American character actor. He acted in a number of small roles both on television and in films such as The Blues Brothers, Poltergeist, Boys Don't Cry and The Texas Chainsaw Massacre 2.

He was a film crew member on the original Texas Chainsaw Massacre film. In the sequel Texas Chainsaw Massacre 2, he portrayed L.G., the radio station manager.

Perryman also starred in Texas independent filmmaker Eagle Pennell's The Whole Shootin' Match and Last Night at the Alamo.

Death
Perryman was killed in his home in Austin, Texas, on April 1, 2009, by a 26-year-old man named Seth Christopher Tatum.  
Tatum, who had recently been released from prison for aggravated robbery, had gone off his medications and had been drinking. He later confessed that he had killed Perryman with an axe. On June 26, 2009 Tatum was indicted on two counts of capital murder. Tatum pleaded guilty to murder and was convicted on February 1, 2011. He was sentenced to life in prison.

Filmography

References

External links

Lou Perryman interview at FearZone

1941 births
2009 deaths
American male film actors
American male television actors
American male voice actors
People from Cooke County, Texas
Male actors from Austin, Texas
People murdered in Texas
Male murder victims
20th-century American male actors
21st-century American male actors